This is a list of universities in Niger.

Institutions
Abdou Moumouni University  
Aboubacar Ibrahim International University

Higher Institute of Mining, Industry and Geology
Islamic University of Niger
Maryam Abacha American University Niger

References

Niger
Niger
Universities